The international Gaon Digital Chart is a chart that ranks the best-performing international songs in South Korea. The data is collected by the Korea Music Content Association. Below is a list of songs that topped the weekly, monthly, and year-end charts, as according to the Gaon 국외 (Foreign) Digital Chart. The Digital Chart ranks songs according to their performance on the Gaon Streaming, Download, BGM, and Mobile charts.

Weekly chart

Monthly charts

Year-end chart

References 

International 2012
Korea International
2012 in South Korean music